Flinn Lazier (born 4 April 1999 in Vail, Colorado) is an American racing driver. Lazier has raced in Formula Vee, Formula Enterprise,  Formula Atlantic, Formula 4, and USF2000. Lazier was also a competitive skier with the Ski & Snowboard Club Vail.

Auto racing career
Lazier was born into a family with a rich auto racing history. Flinn's father, Buddy Lazier, won the 1996 Indianapolis 500, 2000 IRL Championship, and several more professional races. Bob Lazier (Flinn's grandfather) was the 1981 Indianapolis 500 rookie of the year and won the SCCA National Championship Runoffs in Formula B in 1971. Lastly, Jaques Lazier is Flinn's uncle. Jacques had won a single IndyCar Series race in 2001 and also won the SCCA National Championship Runoffs in Formula Vee in 1996.

Lazier made his road racing debut in 2015 in the Colorado Region SCCA Formula Vee class. Debuting near the end of the season, Lazier won all four races he competed at High Plains Raceway. Lazier won the divisional Formula Vee championship in 2016. In 2016 Lazier made his SCCA National Championship Runoffs debut at the Mid-Ohio Sports Car Course. Lazier finished second, after starting third, in the 39 car field.

Lazier started the 2017 season in the SCCA regional Formula Enterprises series. At Barber Motorsports Park Lazier made his debut in the Mazda Road to Indy. He joined Newman Wachs Racing in the U.S. F2000 National Championship for the second round of the 2017 season at Barber Motorsports Park, making his professional debut.

Ski competition
Lazier's grandfather Bob built the Tivoli Lodge, a luxury hotel near the Vail Ski Resort. Bob, Buddy and Jacques were avid skiers. Flinn was also a competitive skier. The young American competed in four International Ski Federation sanctioned events. At Copper Mountain Lazier raced in the Super-G and Super Giant Slalom competitions in 2015.

Racing record

Career summary

SCCA National Championship Runoffs

U.S. F2000 National Championship results

Indy Pro 2000 Championship results

*Season still in progress.

References

1999 births
Racing drivers from Colorado
U.S. F2000 National Championship drivers
Indy Pro 2000 Championship drivers
Indy Lights drivers
SCCA National Championship Runoffs winners
Living people
American male alpine skiers
Newman Wachs Racing drivers
Trans-Am Series drivers
Atlantic Championship drivers
United States F4 Championship drivers